The white-eared solitaire (Entomodestes leucotis) is a species of bird in the family Turdidae found in Bolivia and Peru. Its natural habitat is subtropical or tropical moist montane forests.

References

white-eared solitaire
Birds of the Bolivian Andes
Birds of the Peruvian Andes
white-eared solitaire
Taxonomy articles created by Polbot